Turini (Aymara turi tower, -ni a suffix, "the one with a tower")  is a mountain in the Bolivian Andes which reaches a height of approxilamtely . It is situated in the La Paz Department, Sud Yungas Province, Yanacachi Municipality, south of Unduavi.

References 

Mountains of La Paz Department (Bolivia)